Freddy Got Fingered is a 2001 American surreal black comedy film directed by Tom Green in his feature film directorial debut and written by Green and Derek Harvie. Green stars in the film as a childish slacker who wishes to become a professional cartoonist while dealing with his abusive father's behavior. Its plot resembles Green's struggles as a young man trying to get his television series picked up, which would later become the MTV series The Tom Green Show. The title of the film refers to a plot point where Green's character falsely accuses his father of sexually abusing his brother, the eponymous Freddy.

Released on April 20, 2001, by 20th Century Fox, Freddy Got Fingered was critically panned at the time of its release, with many considering it as one of the worst films of all time. It was also a box office disappointment, grossing only $14.3 million worldwide, slightly above its $14 million budget. It received five Golden Raspberry Awards of its eight nominations, as well as a Dallas-Fort Worth Film Critics Association Award for Worst Picture. However, the film quickly developed a cult following after its release on home video and has earned some critical reevaluation.

Plot
Unemployed 28-year-old cartoonist Gordon "Gord" Brody leaves his parents' home in Portland, Oregon, to pursue his lifelong ambition of obtaining a contract for an animated television series. His parents, Jim and Julie, give him a Chrysler LeBaron which he drives to Los Angeles and starts work at a cheese sandwich factory to make money. Gord shows his drawings to Dave Davidson, the CEO of a major animation studio; Davidson commends the artwork but calls the concepts depicted, including a vigilante "X-Ray Cat", nonsensical. Disheartened, Gord quits his job and returns to his parents.

Jim constantly insults and belittles Gord following his return, telling him to forget about being an animator and "get a job". When Gord pressures his friend Darren into skating on a wooden half-pipe he has built outside the Brody home, Darren falls and breaks his leg. At the hospital, Gord impersonates a doctor, delivers a baby, and meets an attractive nurse named Betty, who uses a wheelchair, has an obsessive penchant for fellatio, and wants to create a rocket-powered wheelchair. Gord lies to his father that he has got a job in the computer industry and goes out to a restaurant with Betty, pretending he is at work. However, Jim sees him there and disparages Betty due to her disabilities. After a fight in the restaurant, Gord is arrested and Betty bails him out. Following her advice, Gord attempts to continue drawing; however, he gets into an argument with Jim, who then smashes Gord's half-pipe. Gord and his parents then go to a family therapy session, where Gord falsely accuses Jim of "fingering" Gord's younger brother, Freddy. The 25-year-old Freddy is sent to a home for sexually molested children despite looking nothing like a child while Julie, being fed up with his abusive behavior and short temper, leaves Jim and ends up dating the basketball player Shaquille O'Neal. While in a drunken stupor, Jim tells Gord how much of a disappointment he is to him. Affected by his father's words, Gord decides to abandon his aspirations to be a cartoonist and gets a job at a local sandwich shop.

After seeing a television news report on Betty's successful rocket-powered wheelchair, Gord is inspired to pursue his dreams once again. He returns to Hollywood with a concept based on his relationship with his father: an animated series called Zebras in America. Jim follows Gord there after threatening Darren into revealing his whereabouts. While Gord is pitching the show to Davidson, Jim bursts in and trashes Davidson's office. Thinking Jim's actions are part of Gord's pitch, Davidson greenlights Zebras in America and gives Gord a million-dollar check. Gord spends a tenth of that money on an elaborate thank you to Betty for inspiring him, and the remainder to relocate the Brody house to Pakistan with his father inside, unconscious—a response to Jim's earlier put-down that "If this were Pakistan, you would have been sewing soccer balls when you were four years old!"

Gord and Jim soon come to terms but are then abducted and held hostage. The kidnapping becomes a news item, as Gord's series has already become popular. After 18 months in captivity, Gord and Jim return to America, where a huge crowd, including Betty and Darren, welcomes them home.

Cast

 Tom Green as Gordon Brody, a childish 28-year-old slacker cartoonist who dreams of having his own cartoon show.
 Rip Torn as Jim Brody, Gord's verbally and emotionally abusive father whom Gord falsely accuses of sexually abusing Freddy by fingering him.
 Marisa Coughlan as Betty Menger, Gord's auto-sadistic girlfriend who dreams of developing a rocket-powered wheelchair and is obsessed with giving fellatio.
 Eddie Kaye Thomas as Freddy Brody, Gord's younger brother. The namesake of the film, he is sent to an institute for sexually abused children after Gord falsely accuses Jim of fingering him.
 Harland Williams as Darren, Gord's bank teller friend who breaks his leg on Gord's skateboard ramp.
 Anthony Michael Hall as Dave Davidson, the head of Radioactive Animation Studios who picks up Gord's cartoons for an animated series.
 Julie Hagerty as Julie Brody, Gord's mother.
 Drew Barrymore (Green's then-fiancée) as Davidson's receptionist
 Shaquille O'Neal as himself
 Jackson Davies as Mr. Malloy, the Brodys' next-door neighbor.
 Connor Widdows as Andy Malloy, the son of Mr. Malloy. He is the center of a running gag where he suffers a brutal facial injury in every scene he appears in.
 Lorena Gale as Psychiatrist/Social worker
 Noel Fisher as Pimply manager
 Stephen Tobolowsky (uncredited) as Uncle Neil
 Joe Flaherty (uncredited) as William

Release
The theatrical release is 87 minutes and received an R rating from the Motion Picture Association of America following requested cuts to tone it down from an NC-17, a rating that Green described as "like porn with murder." As an extra on the DVD release, Green also included a version of the ending, where a small child character gets sliced by the airplane propeller, which he had edited to secure an R rating. The PG-rated cut of Freddy Got Fingered is a mere three minutes long with a comedic voiceover. Some footage was leaked by the Newgrounds website before release. Years later, Tom Fulp, owner of Newgrounds, confirmed that the leak was a publicity stunt.

Reception

Box office
On a budget of $14 million, Freddy Got Fingered grossed $14,254,993 domestically and $78,259 overseas for a worldwide total of $14,333,252, making it initially a commercial failure though it did eventually turn a profit from DVD sales. The film earned $24,300,000 from DVD sales, and was among the top 50 weekly DVD rentals chart. Green has stated in a few interviews in 2010 that DVD sales have been growing many years later and that there was a cult following.   In a 2017 interview, Green stated that the box office receipts for the film did not reflect the actual attendance, as he thinks that moviegoers under the age of 17 bought tickets to Crocodile Dundee in Los Angeles and then snuck into the theater showing his film.

Critical response

Freddy Got Fingered was panned upon release, with many critics considering it to be one of the worst films of all time. Review aggregator Rotten Tomatoes gives the film a score of 11% based on reviews from 95 critics, with an average rating of 3.20/10. The site's consensus reads "Unfavorably comparing it with such infamously bad titles as Battlefield Earth, a significant number of critics are calling Tom Green's extreme gross-out comedy the worst movie they have ever seen." On Metacritic, which assigns a weighted mean rating out of 100 to reviews from film critics, the film has an "Overwhelming dislike" rating score of 13 out of 100 based on 25 reviews. CinemaScore polls revealed the average grade filmgoers gave Freddy Got Fingered was C−, on an A+ to F scale.

The Toronto Star created a one-time new rating for Freddy Got Fingered, giving it "negative one star out of five stars." CNN's Paul Clinton called it "quite simply the worst movie ever released by a major studio in Hollywood history" and listed the running time as "87 awful minutes."

Chicago Sun-Times critic Roger Ebert gave the film a rare zero-star rating and listed it as one of his most hated films of all time, and described the film thus: "This movie doesn't scrape the bottom of the barrel. This movie isn't the bottom of the barrel. This movie isn't below the bottom of the barrel. This movie doesn't deserve to be mentioned in the same sentence with barrels [...]. The day may come when Freddy Got Fingered is seen as a milestone of neo-surrealism. The day may never come when it is seen as funny."

Richard Roeper, on the TV show At the Movies, hosted by Roeper and Ebert, called it "horrible" and expressed the view that Green was a poor comedian, going so far as to say that he "should be flipping burgers somewhere". Along with Ebert, he was offended by the numerous "gross-out" gags. Film critic Leonard Maltin shared Ebert and Roeper's views of the film: "Instantly notorious word-of-mouth debacle became the poster child for all that's wrong with movie comedy. Gags include the maiming of an innocent child and a newborn spun around in the air by its umbilical cord—compounded by the almost unimaginable ineptitude with which they're executed." In 2017, the film critic of The Guardian, Peter Bradshaw, cited it as the worst film he had ever seen, and James Berardinelli says that it is his least-favourite film of all time. Similarly, David Stratton and Margaret Pomeranz of SBS' The Movie Show were not impressed by the film's content and tone. Stratton gave the film zero stars while Pomeranz gave it one star. The magazine Complex ranked the film at number 14 on its "25 Movies That Killed Careers".

A. O. Scott of The New York Times, compared the film to conceptual performance art and praised it "guardedly and with a slightly guilty conscience".

Accolades
The film received eight Golden Raspberry Award nominations in 2002, winning five. In acknowledgment of the critical consensus regarding the film's merits, Green personally appeared at the ceremony to accept his awards, bringing his own red carpet and saying: "I'd just like to say to all the other nominees in the audience: I don't think that I deserve it any more than the rest of you. I'd like to say that; I don't think that it would be true, though." Green would go on to play the harmonica badly for so long that he was dragged off the stage. In February 2010, it was announced that Freddy Got Fingered was nominated for "Worst Picture of the Decade" for the 30th Golden Raspberry Awards but "lost" to Battlefield Earth. Freddy Got Fingered also garnered seven nominations at the 2001 Stinkers Bad Movie Awards, five of which were wins. Following his wins, The Stinkers went ahead and designed their very own trophy for him to collect.

Legacy

Later reviews
Freddy Got Fingered began to see more positive praise over time, becoming a cult classic. Critic Nathan Rabin of The A.V. Club gave the film a rave review in his "My Year of Flops" column, comparing it to the work of Jean-Luc Godard and calling the film "less as a conventional comedy than as a borderline Dadaist provocation, a $15 million prank at the studio's expense" adding "it's utterly rare and wondrous to witness the emergence of a dazzlingly original comic voice. I experienced that glorious sensation watching Fingered...I can honestly say that I've never seen anything remotely like it" and rated it a "Secret Success." In a later column, Rabin stated "I was a little worried that I'd catch flak for giving mad props to a film as divisive and widely reviled as Freddy Got Fingered. So I was relieved to discover that every single comment agreed with my assessment of it... It also didn't escape my attention that my Freddy post was the most commented-upon post in the history of My Year of Flops by a huge margin." Comedian Chris Rock listed Freddy Got Fingered as one of his favorite movies on his website.

Later, in his review of the film Stealing Harvard, a film co-starring Green, Ebert wrote:
"Seeing Tom Green reminded me, as how could it not, of his movie Freddy Got Fingered, which was so poorly received by the film critics that it received only one lonely, apologetic positive review on the Tomatometer. I gave it—let's see—zero stars. Bad movie, especially the scene where Green was whirling the newborn infant around his head by its umbilical cord. But the thing is, I remember Freddy Got Fingered more than a year later. I refer to it sometimes. It is a milestone. And for all its sins, it was at least an ambitious movie, a go-for-broke attempt to accomplish something. It failed, but it has not left me convinced that Tom Green doesn't have good work in him. Anyone with his nerve and total lack of taste is sooner or later going to make a movie worth seeing."

In Green's interview on [[Opie and Anthony|The Opie and Anthony Show]], host Opie said the film had begun to be regarded as "one of the funniest movies ever made". Green said the film had sold a million copies, and that he wished to make a director's cut due to a lot of footage not making the final cut. Green said that he was not trying to make The Jazz Singer and that many fans of the movie shout out scenes from the film regularly at his stand-up performance.Unreality Magazine featured the film in its list of "10 Hilarious Movies That Received Terrible Reviews", noting that critics' taste in comedies tend not to reflect the general public. Vadim Rizov for IFC.com wrote an article titled "In defense of Freddy Got Fingered". He calls the film one of the great underrated comedies of the decade and says the film would go on to do better if it was released today, comparing it to the successful Adult Swim series Aqua Teen Hunger Force.

RedLetterMedia's web series re:View did an episode covering the film, in which they entertained the idea of the film being an elaborate satire, parodying the typical tropes of gross-out comedies of the time. Evidence to support this claim includes the film's use of meta-references, along with its frequent exaggeration of typical gross-out comedy tropes. Co-host Mike Stoklasa went further in suggesting that Green made the film as a prank on the studio, stating, "I don't think Tom Green wanted to make a movie; he was told to make a movie, and he said 'Okay, I'm going to make a movie, and we're just going to make it fucking awful.'"

Director's cut
Green stated that he would like to do a "director's cut" DVD release of the film in 2011 to celebrate the 10th anniversary.

On March 9, 2010, on Loveline'', Green officially announced that a director's cut would be released. In an answer to a question from a fan on his website tomgreen.com in December 2010, Green said that there was no progress yet in regards to the director's cut. In a Reddit "Ask Me Anything" (AMA) Green did on the website Reddit on October 17, 2013, Green responded to a question regarding the release of the director's cut with: "The studio didn't give me the footage to make the directors cut. I want to do it. If you contact New Regency or 20th Century Fox and tell them you want a directors cut  maybe it will happen!"

See also
 List of films considered the worst

References

External links

 
 
 
 
 

2001 films
2001 black comedy films
20th Century Fox films
Internet memes introduced in 2001
American black comedy films
American films with live action and animation
2000s English-language films
Films about brothers
Films about dysfunctional families
Films directed by Tom Green
Films set in Los Angeles
Films set in Pakistan
Films set in Portland, Oregon
Films set in hospitals
Films shot in Los Angeles
Films shot in Vancouver
Regency Enterprises films
Surreal comedy films
Absurdist fiction
2001 directorial debut films
2001 comedy films
Golden Raspberry Award winning films
2000s American films